Jacob Marengo Tutorial College (JMTC) also known as Jacob Marengo Senior Secondary School in Namibia, located at Mungunda Street in Katutura, Windhoek

History

Founded by Ottilie Abrahams in 1985. Jacob Marengo Tutorial College was established to cater the Namibian youth that was older to attend normal High School but, have ambitions to complete their secondary education. Today JMTC accept students of all ages and has been an excellent academic partner with other high schools in the country.

Vision

JMTC stimulates adult students to complete their academic endeavors. It also prepares students to enter Universities in Namibia as well as abroad with high inspirations to succeed. JMT-College has proposals to embark on service learning and broaden student awareness to global technology. GLADYS Karirirue Kahaka Phd, a local scientist who attended JMTC is awarded a Unesco-L'Oréal For Women in Science (FWIS) international fellowships this year.

References

External links 

 Official homepage of the City of Windhoek – Windhuk
 Address of Jacob Marengo Tutorial College
 Article on Dr. Karirirue Kahaka
 L'Oréal For Women in Science
 Jacob Marengo Senior Secondary School

Schools in Windhoek
Educational institutions established in 1985
1985 establishments in South West Africa